Lucas Kilian (1579 – 1637) was a German engraver and member of the Kilian family of engravers in Augsburg.

Biography
He was the son of Bartholomaus Kilian the elder and Maria Pfeiffelmann. After his father's death in 1588 his mother remarried Dominicus Custos and he and his brother Wolfgang became his pupils. Kilian's engraved portrait of Albrecht Dürer, based on a Dürer self-portrait from a copy of Dürer's Feast of the Rosary by Johann Rottenhammer, "became one of the best-known representations of Dürer to posterity." He is also known for his engravings after Cornelis Cornelisz. van Haarlem. His anatomy broadsides, Catoptri Microcosmici ('Mirrors of the Microcosm'), produced after designs by the medical doctor Johannes Remmelin and published by Stephan Michelspacher, were much reprinted after their original publication in 1613, including a 1615 pamphlet, a 1619 book, reprints in German, Latin, Dutch and English, as well as a 1754 Italian plagiarism.
He died in Augsburg.

References

Sources
Lucas Kilian on Artnet

External links
 

1579 births
1637 deaths
Kilian family